Thomas L. Sakmyster (born 1943) is an American professor emeritus of history of the University of Cincinnati, known for his studies of early 20th-century Hungary, including the "first full-length scholarly study of Hungary's most controversial figure" of the 20th century and the "most important work on the admiral to date", Miklós Horthy, as well as a meticulously-researched even-handed biography of the Hungarian-Soviet spy J. Peters.

Background

Thomas L. Sakmyster was born in 1943 in Perth Amboy, New Jersey. In 1965, he received a BA from Dartmouth. In 1967, he received an MA and in 1971 a doctorate, both in history, from Indiana University. His dissertation was on Hungary and the Coming of the European Crisis, 1937-1938.

Career 

In 1971, Sakmyster began to teach history at the University of Cincinnati.  In 1985, he served as director of graduate studies.  As of 1995, he served as Walter Langsam Professor of European History. In 2003, he served as acting chair of History.  In 2005, he retired and in 2007 became professor emeritus.

Works

Sakmyster's works include:

Books:
 Hungary, the Great Powers, and the Danubian Crisis, 1936-1939 (1980)
 Hungary's Admiral on Horseback: Miklós Horthy, 1918-1944 (1994)
 Miklos Horthy:  Ungarn 1918-1944 (2006)
 Red Conspirator:  J. Peters and the American Communist Underground (Champaign, IL:  University of Illinois Press, 2007)
 A Communist Odyssey: The Life of József Pogány / John Pepper (Central European University Press, 2012)

Articles:
 "The Hungarian State to Germany of August, 1948:  Some New Evidence on Hungary in Hitler's Pre-Munich Policy" Canadian Slavic Studies (1969)
 "Bethlen István Titkos Iratai, Edited by Miklós Szinai and Laszlo Sziics," Canadian Slavic Studies (1974)
 "Army Officers and Foreign Policy in Interwar Hungary, 1918-41," Journal of Contemporary History (1975)
 "From Habsburg Admiral to Hungarian Regent: The Political Metamorphosis of Miklós Horthy 1918–1921," East European Quarterly (1983)

See also 

 Miklós Horthy
 J. Peters 
 József Pogány

References

External sources

 University of Cincinnati

American historians
American people of Hungarian descent
Dartmouth College alumni
Indiana University alumni
University of Cincinnati faculty
1943 births
Living people